Pantelić  is a Serbian surname, derived from the given name Pantelija, a variant of Greek Pantelis. It may refer to:

Dragan Pantelić, former Yugoslavian international footballer
Miodrag Pantelić, former Serbian international footballer
Marko Pantelić, former Serbian international footballer
Natasha Pantelić, British Labour politician and candidate in the 2021 Chesham and Amersham by-election

Serbian surnames
Slavic-language surnames
Patronymic surnames
Surnames from given names